Megill is a surname of Irish origin, being a variant of the surname McGill. Notable people with the surname include:

Kenneth Megill (born 1939), American philosopher, trade unionist, political activist, and records and knowledge manager
Trevor Megill (born 1993), American professional baseball pitcher
Tylor Megill (born 1995), American professional baseball pitcher

See also
McGill (surname)